Dial 999 may refer to:

999 (emergency telephone number), urgent assistance contact
Dial 999 (1938 film), British crime drama directed by Lawrence Huntington
Dial 999 (1955 film), British crime drama written and directed by Montgomery Tully
 Dial 999 (TV series), a British crime television series starring Robert Beatty